Kenneth West is a Filipino international rugby union prop forward.

Born in 1988, Kenny attended Devonport High School for Boys in Plymouth and is the coach of their youth team, the Stonehouse Sharks.

Kenny's international debut was with the Philippines at the 2009 Asian Five Nations division three.

References

External links
 www.rugbyinasia.com/philippines

Living people
Filipino rugby union players
Sportspeople from Devonport, Plymouth
People educated at Devonport High School for Boys
Philippines international rugby union players
Year of birth missing (living people)
Rugby union props